Chereninup Creek Reserve is an  nature reserve in south-west Western Australia. It is located between the Stirling Range National Park and the Fitzgerald River National Park, on the southern edge of the Wheatbelt, and is owned and managed by Bush Heritage Australia (BHA), by which it was purchased in 2003, and forms part of BHA's Gondwana Link project.

Landscape
The reserve comprises undulating country vegetated with woodlands, shrublands and Kwongan heath communities.  Chereninup Creek flows through it.  An area of about 60 ha of the reserve was previously cleared but has since been revegetated.  The flora is very rich with a high diversity of Eucalyptus, Dryandra and Banksia species.

References

External links
 Bush Heritage Australia

Bush Heritage Australia reserves
Nature reserves in Western Australia
2003 establishments in Australia
Great Southern (Western Australia)